Phryxe vulgaris is a species of fly in the family Tachinidae.

Distribution
Palearctic.

References

Muscomorph flies of Europe
Exoristinae
Insects described in 1810